United States President John Adams gave two State of the Union speeches:
John Adams' First State of the Union Address
John Adams' Second State of the Union Address